Aiaal Petrovich Lazarev (born 19 March 1986 in Verkhnevilyuysk, Yakutia, Russia) Russian, Kyrgyz freestyle wrestler, champion and multiple medalist of the Asian Championships, World Cup medalist, participant in two Olympics (2016 and 2020). International Master of Sports of Kyrgyzstan. By nationality - Yakut.  freestyle wrestler. He is a three-time bronze medalist (2010, 2013, 2016), silver medalist (2021), and an Asian Champion (2015).

He competed in the men's freestyle 125 kg event at the 2016 Summer Olympics. and 2020 Summer Olympics. the first wrestler who was able to achieve such results in history from Russian region Yakutia. 

In 2020, he won one of the bronze medals in the men's 125 kg event at the 2020 Individual Wrestling World Cup held in Belgrade, Serbia.

References

External links
 

1986 births
Living people
Kyrgyzstani male sport wrestlers
Olympic wrestlers of Kyrgyzstan
Wrestlers at the 2016 Summer Olympics
Wrestlers at the 2010 Asian Games
Wrestlers at the 2014 Asian Games
Asian Games competitors for Kyrgyzstan
Asian Wrestling Championships medalists
Wrestlers at the 2020 Summer Olympics